The Circuit Zolder, also known as Circuit Terlamen, is an undulating  motorsport race track in Heusden-Zolder, Belgium.

History
Built in 1963, Zolder hosted the Formula One Belgian Grand Prix on 10 separate occasions in the 1970s and 1980s, as well as the 1980 Belgian motorcycle Grand Prix. F1 moved to Zolder in 1973 and with the exception of a race at Nivelles-Baulers in 1974, Zolder was the location of the Belgian Grand Prix until 1982. That year, Canadian driver Gilles Villeneuve was killed during qualifying at the 1982 Belgian Grand Prix. Villeneuve's Ferrari 126C2 collided at speed with the March 821 of Jochen Mass. The Ferrari was torn up in the accident and when rolling, Villeneuve was thrown from the car.

After Villeneuve's death, the Belgian Grand Prix was held at Spa-Francorchamps in 1983, before returning to Zolder one final time in 1984. Fittingly, Ferrari driver Michele Alboreto won the race carrying Villeneuve's #27 on his car. Since , the Belgian Grand Prix has permanently moved to Spa.

Zolder has also been used for cycling events including the UCI Road World Championships twice in 1969 and 2002 and the UCI Cyclo-cross World Championships in 1970, 2002 and 2016. The latter saw the first confirmed use of mechanical doping when Femke Van den Driessche was  found to have a secret motor inside her bike. Since 2009, Circuit Zolder has hosted a cyclo-cross race in December for the World Cup. The circuit hosted the UCI BMX World Championships in 2015. In 2019 and for the first time ever the UCI BMX World Championships returned to Circuit Zolder.

In the beginning of 2006, the track underwent safety adaptations. In 2007, the track hosted a Champ Car World Series Grand Prix, and a round of the FIA GT Championship. The track was venue of a round of the World Series by Renault championship from 2003 to 2006, and replaced Zandvoort as site for the Masters of Formula 3 in 2007 and 2008. Zolder was featured on the car programme Top Gear in 2008. In the episode, the show's British hosts competed against their German counterparts from D MOTOR. Zolder hosted also the FIA WTCC Race of Belgium in 2010, 2011, and 2020. The last race they drove in 2011 was won by Rob Huff in a Chevrolet and Gabriele Tarquini in a SEAT. The WTCC then disappeared from the Belgian circuits until in 2014 the circus returned to Spa.

At this time, mainly the Blancpain Sprint Series and the BRCC national championship hosted a race in Zolder. The 24 Hours of Zolder endurance event is also held as a stand-alone event around the end of August or the beginning of September. NASCAR Whelen Euro Series have hosted their final race of the season in Zolder since 2015.

In 2019, for the first time in 17 years, the Deutsche Tourenwagen Masters returned to Circuit Zolder. But the circuit lost its place in the DTM calendar to Spa-Francorchamps in 2022.

Lap records 

The unofficial all-time outright track record is 1:12.821, set by Sébastien Bourdais in a Panoz DP01, during 2nd qualifying for the 2007 Belgian Champ Car Grand Prix. The official fastest race lap records at the Circuit Zolder are listed as:

Noise limits
In general Circuit Zolder has a noise limit of 96dbA, which is measured at 2 points along the track. One is just after turn 4 (Bianchi) and the second one is between turn 7 and 8. These can be recognised by blue poles. During international testdays and most racing weekends, the noise limits are removed.

Events

 Current

 April: DMV Goodyear Racing Days, 1000 km Zolder
 May: Belcar New Race Festival
 July: Dutch Supercar Challenge Zolder Superprix, Historic Grand Prix Zolder
 August: Belcar 24 Hours of Zolder
 September: FIA European Truck Racing Championship Belgian Truck Grand Prix, Porsche Carrera Cup Benelux
 October: NASCAR Whelen Euro Series NASCAR GP Belgium, Fun Cup, Belcar

 Former

 24 hours iLumen European Solar Challenge
 ADAC Formel Masters (2011)
 BMW M1 Procar Championship (1979)
 Blancpain Sprint Series (2014–2015, 2017–2018)
 BOSS GP (2000, 2003–2010, 2013, 2015, 2017)
 Champ Car World Series Belgian Champ Car Grand Prix (2007)
 Deutsche Tourenwagen Masters (2002, 2019–2021)
 Deutsche Tourenwagen Meisterschaft (1984–1994)
 European Formula 5000 Championship (1974–1975)
 European Formula Two Championship (1975, 1980, 1983)
 European Touring Car Championship (1963–1968, 1977–1988, 2001)
 European Touring Car Cup (2015, 2017)
 FIA ETCR – eTouring Car World Cup (2022)
 FIA European Formula 3 Championship (1977–1984)
 FIA GT Championship (1999–2001, 2007–2009)
 FIM Endurance World Championship (1971–1972, 2006)
 Formula 750 (1977)
 Formula BMW Europe (2008)
 Formula One Belgian Grand Prix (1973, 1975–1982, 1984)
 Formula Renault Eurocup (2005–2007)
 Grand Prix motorcycle racing Belgian motorcycle Grand Prix (1980)
 International Formula 3000 (1988)
 International Sports Racing Series (1997)
 Masters of Formula 3 (2007–2008)
 Sidecar World Championship (1980)
 Super Tourenwagen Cup (1994–1997)
 Superleague Formula (2008–2011)
 TCR Europe Touring Car Series (2020)
 V8Star Series (2002)
 W Series (2019)
 World Touring Car Championship FIA WTCC Race of Belgium (2010–2011)
 World Touring Car Cup FIA WTCR Race of Belgium (2020)
 Zolder Historic Superprix

Cycling
 1981 Tour de France
 2002 UCI Road World Championships
 2002 UCI Cyclo-cross World Championships
 2016 UCI Cyclo-cross World Championships
 2019 UCI BMX World Championships
 Grand Prix Erik De Vlaeminck
 Telenet SuperPrestige Cyclocross

Notes

References

External links

Satellite picture by Google Maps

Map and circuit history at RacingCircuits.info

 
Formula One circuits
Belgian Grand Prix
Motorsport venues in Belgium
Champ Car circuits
Grand Prix motorcycle circuits
World Touring Car Championship circuits
Circuit Zolder
Circuit Zolder